Michigan's 15th congressional district is an obsolete congressional district in the state of Michigan.

Historically, the district's politics have been dominated by the Dingell family since its creation after the 1930 United States census. Its first congressman, John D. Dingell, Sr., was elected in 1932 and served until his death in 1955. His son, John, Jr. won a special election to succeed him; upon Dingell Jr.'s own retirement in 2015, his wife Debbie Dingell won his seat and is now the incumbent. As such, the district (even after it was absorbed by the 12th district in 2013) has been represented continuously by a Dingell for the last 89 years. 

The 15th district historically had left-of-center voting tendencies. Its last Cook PVI rating was D+13, meaning it supported Democratic candidates at a rate of 13 percentage points greater than the national average.

This district became obsolete for the 113th Congress in 2013 as congressional district lines were redrawn to accommodate the loss of the seat due to reapportionment as a result of the 2010 census. Most of the district's territory, including Ann Arbor and Dingell's home in Dearborn, became part of the new 12th district, which had previously been based in Oakland, and Macomb Counties.

Along with the 1st district and the now-defunct 16th district, the 15th has been historically frequently represented by politicians of Polish descent. Three of the district's six elected representatives (Dingell Jr. served here twice and in between he was a representative from the 16th district, which was later dissolved) have been Polish-Americans.

Major cities from 2003 to 2013
Ann Arbor
Dearborn
Taylor
Dearborn Heights
Inkster
Romulus
Ypsilanti
Monroe

Voting

List of representatives

References
U.S. Representatives 1837-2003, Michigan Manual 2003-2004

 Congressional Biographical Directory of the United States 1774–present

Former congressional districts of the United States
14
Constituencies established in 1933
1933 establishments in Michigan
Constituencies disestablished in 2013
2013 disestablishments in Michigan